Prochilodus lineatus, the streaked prochilod, is a species of ray-finned fish in the family Prochilodontidae. It is native to the Paraná—Paraguay and Paraíba do Sul river basins in South America. It performs long breeding migrations and supports very important fisheries.

Local names
In Spanish its common name is sábalo; in Brazil it receives the names curimbatá, curimba, corimbatá or grumatã.In the United States it is also known by the technical synonym Tarpon prochilodus. There are mother species of fish with the common name sábalo; P. lineatus is therefore distinguished sometimes as sábalo jetón (colloquial Spanish for "big-mouth") or chupabarro ("mud-sucker").

Appearance

Its body is tall and compressed, greenish-gray (lighter in the belly), with yellowish green fins. Its mouth is circular and projects towards the front; it has two series of small teeth.

Behavior
This fish prefers deep waters and it is illiophagous, i.e. it sucks and eats organic mud, for which its mouth is especially adapted. This incidentally makes it difficult to fish with a bait. It migrates in large banks, looking for warm waters during the spring in order to lay its eggs.

In the Paraná River
P. lineatus is considered the key species of the Paraná River, since it forms the base of the food chain that ends with larger fish like the surubí catfish (Pseudoplatystoma) and golden dorado (Salminus brasiliensis). Regulations in place in Santa Fe and Entre Ríos, Argentina, have proven ineffective to preserve the species, which is being severely exploited, both for internal consumption and for export. Experts estimate that capturing 20,000 tonnes of sábalo per year is the upper limit of sustainability. Exports, however, of about 13,000 tonnes in 1998, grew to 34,000 tonnes in 2004, after the depreciation of the Argentine peso caused by the economic crisis tripled its local value.

As the fish population dwindles, fishermen who depend on their captures for their livelihood are keeping smaller specimens, often not mature and which therefore have had no time to reproduce.

Widespread disregard of prescribed net sizes and the presence of illegal processing plants, which the local governments do not control, have compelled environmental groups to protest. The issue turned into a jurisdiction conflict when Santa Fe tightened the regulations in 2005, forbidding the capture of sábalos under 42 cm long, while Entre Ríos kept the limit looser at 40 cm. On July 13, about 400 fishermen blocked the Rosario access to the Rosario-Victoria Bridge that joins the two provinces. On August 1, after Entre Ríos matched its regulations with those of Santa Fe, 300 fishermen and freezing plant workers from Victoria did the same. They were pressured, according to certain claims, by the threat of unemployment if their plants cannot fill their export quotas.

In October 2006, largely to facilitate the reproduction of sábalo, the legislative branch of Santa Fe attempted to pass a temporary ban on commercial fishing in the Paraná. This ban was vetoed by the executive, as it had no counterpart in the neighbouring Entre Ríos. On 21 December 2006, the national government banned exports of fish of the Paraná River for eight months starting on 1 January 2007.

References 

 Los Peces Que Tenemos (in Spanish)
 Pesca & náutica: Nuestros peces (in Spanish)
 Pesca en Argentina (in Spanish)
 Fundación PROTEGER, Amigos de la Tierra, Argentina (in Spanish, some documents in English)
 

Fish of South America
Freshwater fish of Argentina
Prochilodontidae
Taxa named by Achille Valenciennes
Fish described in 1837